Gadabout may refer to:

Persons
 Gadabout Gaddis, Roscoe Vernon Gaddis, 20th-century American fisherman and television pioneer

Vehicles
 Gadabout (1913-15 automobile), American automobile manufactured in Newark, New Jersey 
 Gadabout (1946 automobile), American automobile manufactured in Grosse Pointe Park, Michigan
 Phillips Gadabout, historical British motorcycle

See also
 Sir Gadabout: The Worst Knight in the Land